Dujiaping station is a subway station in Changsha, Hunan, China, operated by the Changsha subway operator Changsha Metro.

Station layout
The station has one island platform.

History
The station was completed in July 2017. The station opened on 26 May 2019.

Surrounding area
 Former Residence of Xu Guangda

References

Railway stations in Hunan
Railway stations in China opened in 2019